The Phi Tau Phi  Scholastic  Honor  Society  of   Taiwan, the  Republic  of  China (or simply Phi Tau Phi or) was founded by American professor Joseph H. Ehlers  in 1921 in Peiyang University, China. This Society aims to encourage scholarship, stimulate research, reward scholastic achievement, and form bonds of intellectual and professional fellowship. Phi Tau Phi stands for Philosophia, Technologia, and Physiologia, which collectively represent all disciplines of  learning.

External links 
 Phi Tau Phi.org

Honor societies
Student organizations established in 1921
1921 establishments in China